Masterton is a large town in New Zealand.

Masterton may also refer to:

Masterton (New Zealand electorate), an electoral district based around Masterton, New Zealand
Masterton (soccer), a soccer club based in Masterton, New Zealand that merged with Carterton in 1996 to form Wairarapa United
Masterton Aerodrome, an airfield in Masterton, New Zealand
Masterton railway station, a railway station in Masterton, New Zealand
Masterton Trophy, a National Hockey League award named after Bill Masterton

Surname
Bill Masterton (1938–1968), ice hockey player
Danny Masterton (1954–2020), Scottish footballer
Graham Masterton (born 1946), British horror author
James Masterton (born 1973), music writer and columnist
Nancy Masterton (1930–2015), American legislator
Rebecca Masterton, British Islamic scholar
Steven Masterton (born 1985), Scottish footballer